Cyclopentadienyl nickel nitrosyl is a highly toxic organonickel chemical. In its pure form, it is a diamagnetic, volatile, relatively air-stable liquid with a blood-red color. It has been reported to be the simplest mono-cyclopentadienyl metal complex.
The chemical was discovered in 1954 by a team at The International Nickel Company. The molecular formula is (C5H5)NiNO. It can be prepared by treating nickelocene with nitric acid. It is extremely toxic (T+), and is considered to be one of the most poisonous organometallic chemicals ever developed. Its toxicity is said to be comparable to nickel tetracarbonyl.

Due to its high toxicity, cyclopentadienyl nickel nitrosyl has very limited usage. It was patented as a fuel additive and anti-caking agent, but it was never used for these purposes due to the health hazards it posed. In the past, it was also studied for its spectroscopic qualities, and saw limited use as a catalyst in organic chemical reactions, but it has since been discounted in favor of less toxic compounds.

See also
 Cyclopentadienyl
 Cyclopentadienyl complex
 Cyclopentadiene

Notes 

Cyclopentadienyl complexes
Organonickel compounds
Half sandwich compounds